Bjorkstrand or Björkstrand is a surname. Notable people with the surname include:

Kåre Björkstrand (born 1987), Finnish footballer 
Oliver Bjorkstrand (born 1995), Danish ice hockey player
Patrick Bjorkstrand (born 1992), Danish ice hockey player
Todd Bjorkstrand (born 1962), American ice hockey coach and former player